Rowland is an unincorporated community in Lincoln County, in the U.S. state of Kentucky.

History
A post office called Rowland was established in 1886, and remained in operation until 1912. The community has the name of D. W. C. Rowland, a railroad official.

References

Unincorporated communities in Lincoln County, Kentucky
Unincorporated communities in Kentucky